Hillingdon Cycle Circuit is a purpose-built road cycling circuit situated in Minet Country Park, Hayes in west London. The 0.93 mile long, 6 metre wide circuit is used for year-round racing, training and leisure riding.

History
Chas Messenger, the local British Cycling Facilities Officer, organised cycle racing on the unopened Hayes Bypass for several years in the 1990s. Triple Olympic champion and Tour de France winner Bradley Wiggins started his racing career on this prototype circuit as a schoolboy.

Once the bypass opened to traffic, Messenger and Bill Bannister began searching for another closed road circuit in the area. After some abortive suggestions had been investigated, Minet Park emerged as a possible solution. What is now the park had been used to dump waste earth from the construction of the bypass. The area was, however, zoned for sports activities and community use.

Paul Barker, a member of the Westerley Cycling Club and a London Borough of Hillingdon councillor was a key figure in steering plans for the circuit to a successful completion.

The circuit was designed by Don Wiseman as a fast, easy to ride course: it is possible to pedal all the way round the circuit's corners. The circuit opened to riders in 1997.

The early circuit headquarters were temporary huts. There are now permanent storage facilities (part funded by the Kenton Road Club) and in 2010 a clubhouse was opened beside the track with meeting and catering facilities and a classroom. 

Barker suggested to local cycling coaches Brian Wright and Ray Kelly that a children's club be started. The Prime Coaching organisation, together with others and the parents of the children created and developed the Hillingdon Slipstreamers. The group still meet at the circuit every Saturday morning. Bradley Wiggins is now the Slipstreamers' president.

Usage
The circuit is used regularly for racing and hosts an annual round of the national circuit race championship. There is a regular Winter series running from December to February. During the season there are races on Tuesday and Wednesday evenings and most weekends.

There are formal and informal training sessions three or four days per week.

A women-only leisure cycling group meet at the circuit on Friday afternoons.

Youth only cycling club, Hillingdon Slipstreamers use the circuit every Saturday morning until midday, throughout the year.

Duathlon events are run on the circuit on selected Mondays from April to August.

The circuit is also used by the London Region Nordic Ski Club, for roller skiing events, for Human Powered Vehicle races, and for charity fun rides.

See also
 Redbridge Cycling Centre
 Crystal Palace (circuit)
 Betteshanger Park
 Cyclopark

External links
 Hillingdon Cycle Circuit web site
 Hillingdon Slipstreamers web site
 Hillingdon Cycle Circuit details at British Cycling

Sport in the London Borough of Hillingdon
Cycle racing in London
Sports venues in London